Malloquete (died February 11, 1546) was a Mapuche toqui that led an army of Moluche from the region north of the Bio Bio River against Pedro de Valdivia in the 1546 Battle of Quilacura.

References

Sources 
 Jerónimo de Vivar,  Crónica y relación copiosa y verdadera de los reinos de Chile (Chronicle and abundant and true relation of the kingdoms of Chile) ARTEHISTORIA REVISTA DIGITAL; Crónicas de América (on line in Spanish)
  Capítulo LXVI, Que trata de lo que le sucedió al general Pedro de Valdivia junto al río de Andalién

16th-century Mapuche people
People of the Arauco War
Indigenous leaders of the Americas